Saulmory-Villefranche (before 2017: Saulmory-et-Villefranche) is a commune in the Meuse department in Grand Est in north-eastern France.

See also
Communes of the Meuse department

References

Saumoryvillefranche